The 1980 Portuguese legislative election took place on 5 October. The election renewed all 250 members of the Assembly of the Republic.

In January 1980, the Democratic Alliance, which had won the previous election, on 2 December 1979, entered office with Francisco Sá Carneiro leading the government. However, this election was an extraordinary election, and so, in 1980, another election was held.

The Democratic Alliance (AD) won, again, and increased the majority they had achieved 10 months before, in December 1979. The AD won almost 48% of the votes and gathered 134 seats, six more. The Socialist Party (PS), now leading a broad coalition called Republican and Socialist Front, got basically the same vote share and seats as in 1979. The Communist led alliance, United People Alliance (APU) lost some ground, gathering almost 17% of the votes, 2% lower than 10 months earlier.

Turnout was one the highest ever, almost 84%, and in terms of ballots cast, the more than 6 million votes cast are still, as of 2022, a record in Portuguese elections.

Electoral system 
The Assembly of the Republic has 250 members elected to four-year terms. Governments do not require absolute majority support of the Assembly to hold office, as even if the number of opposers of government is larger than that of the supporters, the number of opposers still needs to be equal or greater than 126 (absolute majority) for both the Government's Programme to be rejected or for a motion of no confidence to be approved.

The number of seats assigned to each district depends on the district magnitude. The use of the d'Hondt method makes for a higher effective threshold than certain other allocation methods such as the Hare quota or Sainte-Laguë method, which are more generous to small parties.

For these elections, and compared with the 1979 elections, the MPs distributed by districts were the following:

Parties 
The table below lists the parties represented in the Assembly of the Republic during the second half of the 1st legislature (1976–1980), as the 1979 election was a national by-election, and that also contested the elections:

Campaign period

Party slogans

National summary of votes and seats

|- 
| colspan=12| 
|- 
! rowspan="2" colspan=3 style="background-color:#E9E9E9" align=left|Parties
! rowspan="2" style="background-color:#E9E9E9" align=right|Votes
! rowspan="2" style="background-color:#E9E9E9" align=right|%
! rowspan="2" style="background-color:#E9E9E9" align=right|±
! colspan="5" style="background-color:#E9E9E9" align="center"|Seats
! rowspan="2" style="background-color:#E9E9E9;text-align:right;" |MPs %/votes %
|- style="background-color:#E9E9E9"
! style="background-color:#E9E9E9;text-align=center|1979
! style="background-color:#E9E9E9;text-align=center|1980
! style="background-color:#E9E9E9" align=right|±
! style="background-color:#E9E9E9" align=right|%
! style="background-color:#E9E9E9" align=right|±
|-
| style="background-color:lightblue;border-bottom-style:hidden;" rowspan="3"|
| bgcolor="2A52BE" align="center" |
|align=left|Democratic Alliance
|2,706,667||44.91||2.4||121||126||5||50.40||2.0||1.12
|-
| bgcolor="" |
|align=left|Social Democratic
|147,644||2.45||0.1||7||8||1||3.20||0.4||1.31
|-
| bgcolor="" |
|align=left|Democratic and Social Centre
|13,765||0.23||0.2||0||0||0||0.00||0.0||0.0
|-
|- style="background-color:lightblue;"
| style="text-align:left;" colspan="3"| Total Democratic Alliance
|width="65" align="right" style="background-color:lightblue"|2,868,076
|width="40" align="right" style="background-color:lightblue"|47.59
|width="40" align="right" style="background-color:lightblue"|2.3
|width="40" align="right" style="background-color:lightblue"|128
|width="40" align="right" style="background-color:lightblue"|134
|width="40" align="right" style="background-color:lightblue"|6
|width="40" align="right" style="background-color:lightblue"|53.60
|width="40" align="right" style="background-color:lightblue"|2.4
|width="40" align="right" style="background-color:lightblue"|1.13
|-
| style="background-color:#DE98B2;border-bottom-style:hidden;" rowspan="2"|
| bgcolor="" align="center" |
|align=left|Republican and Socialist Front
|1,606,198||26.65||||||71||||28.40||||1.07
|-
| bgcolor="" |
|align=left|Socialist
|67,081||1.11||||74||3||||1.20||||1.08
|-
|- style="background-color:#DE98B2;"
| style="text-align:left;" colspan="3"|Total Republican and Socialist Front 
|width="65" align="right" style="background-color:#DE98B2"|1,673,279
|width="40" align="right" style="background-color:#DE98B2"|27.76
|width="40" align="right" style="background-color:#DE98B2"|0.4
|width="40" align="right" style="background-color:#DE98B2"|74
|width="40" align="right" style="background-color:#DE98B2"|74
|width="40" align="right" style="background-color:#DE98B2"|0
|width="40" align="right" style="background-color:#DE98B2"|29.60
|width="40" align="right" style="background-color:#DE98B2"|0.0
|width="40" align="right" style="background-color:#DE98B2"|1.07
|-
|colspan="2" style="width: 10px" bgcolor=red align="center" |
|align=left|United People Alliance
|1,009,505||16.75||2.0||47||41||6||16.40||2.4||0.98
|-
|colspan="2" style="width: 10px" bgcolor=#E2062C align="center" | 
|align=left|People's Democratic Union
|83,204||1.38||0.8||1||1||0||0.40||0.0||0.29
|-
|colspan="2" style="width: 10px" bgcolor="" |
|align=left|Workers Party of Socialist Unity
|83,095||1.38||1.2||0||0||0||0.00||0.0||0.0
|-
|colspan="2" style="width: 10px" bgcolor=red align="center" |
|align=left|Revolutionary Socialist
|60,496||1.00||0.4||0||0||0||0.00||0.0||0.0
|-
|colspan="2" style="width: 10px" bgcolor=pink align="center" |
|align=left|Labour
|39,408||0.65||||||0||||0.00||||0.0
|-
|colspan="2" style="width: 10px" bgcolor="" |
|align=left|Workers' Communist Party
|35,409||0.59||0.3||0||0||0||0.00||0.0||0.0
|-
|colspan="2" style="width: 10px" bgcolor=yellow align="center" | 
|align=left|PDC / MIRN/PDP / FN
|23,819||0.40||||||0||||0.00||||0.0
|-
|colspan="2" style="width: 10px" bgcolor="" |
|align=left|Democratic Party of the Atlantic
|8,529||0.14||||||0||||0.00||||0.0
|-
|colspan="2" style="width: 10px" bgcolor=darkred align="center" |
|align=left|OCMLP
|3,913||0.06||0.0||0||0||0||0.00||0.0||0.0
|-
|colspan=3 align=left style="background-color:#E9E9E9"|Total valid 
|width="65" align="right" style="background-color:#E9E9E9"|5,888,733
|width="40" align="right" style="background-color:#E9E9E9"|97.72
|width="40" align="right" style="background-color:#E9E9E9"|0.4
|width="40" align="right" style="background-color:#E9E9E9"|250
|width="40" align="right" style="background-color:#E9E9E9"|250
|width="40" align="right" style="background-color:#E9E9E9"|0
|width="40" align="right" style="background-color:#E9E9E9"|100.00
|width="40" align="right" style="background-color:#E9E9E9"|0
|width="40" style="text-align:right;background-color:#E9E9E9"|—
|-
|colspan=3|Blank ballots
|34,552||0.57||0.1||colspan=6 rowspan=4|
|-
|colspan=3|Invalid ballots
|103,140||1.71||0.3
|-
|colspan=3 align=left style="background-color:#E9E9E9"|Total 
|width="65" align="right" style="background-color:#E9E9E9"|6,026,395
|width="40" align="right" style="background-color:#E9E9E9"|100.00
|width="40" align="right" style="background-color:#E9E9E9"|
|-
|colspan=3|Registered voters/turnout
||7,179,023||83.94||1.0
|-
| colspan=12 align=left | Source: Comissão Nacional de Eleições
|}

Distribution by constituency

|- class="unsortable"
!rowspan=2|Constituency!!%!!S!!%!!S!!%!!S!!%!!S!!%!!S!!%!!S
!rowspan=2|TotalS
|- class="unsortable" style="text-align:center;"
!colspan=2 | AD
!colspan=2 | FRS
!colspan=2 | APU
!colspan=2 | PSD
!colspan=2 | PS
!colspan=2 | UDP
|-
| style="text-align:left;" | Azores
|colspan="4" bgcolor="#AAAAAA"|
| 3.1
| -
| style="background:; color:white;"|57.0
| 4
| 27.3
| 1
| 1.3
| -
| 5
|-
| style="text-align:left;" | Aveiro
| style="background:#2A52BE; color:white;"|58.8
| 10
| 27.1
| 4
| 6.8
| 1
|colspan="4" rowspan="11" bgcolor="#AAAAAA"|
|colspan="2" bgcolor="#AAAAAA"|
| 15
|-
| style="text-align:left;" | Beja
| 22.4
| 1
| 21.1
| 1
| style="background:; color:white;"|47.1
| 3
| 1.3
| -
| 5
|-
| style="text-align:left;" | Braga
| style="background:#2A52BE; color:white;"|54.9
| 9
| 29.3
| 5
| 8.4
| 1
| 0.9
| -
| 15
|-
| style="text-align:left;" | Bragança
| style="background:#2A52BE; color:white;"|65.3
| 3
| 21.3
| 1
| 4.8
| -
| 1.0
| -
| 4
|-
| style="text-align:left;" | Castelo Branco
| style="background:#2A52BE; color:white;"|51.0
| 4
| 30.3
| 2
| 10.5
| -
| 0.7
| -
| 6
|-
| style="text-align:left;" | Coimbra
| style="background:#2A52BE; color:white;"|46.1
| 6
| 35.9
| 5
| 9.9
| 1
| 0.8
| -
| 12
|-
| style="text-align:left;" |  Évora
| 29.2
| 1
| 18.7
| 1
| style="background:; color:white;"|45.7
| 3
| 0.9
| -
| 5
|-
| style="text-align:left;" | Faro
| style="background:#2A52BE; color:white;"|37.2
| 4
| 34.7
| 4
| 16.7
| 1
| 1.9
| -
| 9
|-
| style="text-align:left;" | Guarda
| style="background:#2A52BE; color:white;"|60.6
| 4
| 26.3
| 1
| 5.0
| -
| 0.7
| -
| 5
|-
| style="text-align:left;" | Leiria
| style="background:#2A52BE; color:white;"|59.8
| 7
| 22.7
| 3
| 9.7
| 1
| 1.0
| -
| 11
|-
| style="text-align:left;" | Lisbon
| style="background:#2A52BE; color:white;"|41.6
| 25
| 28.1
| 17
| 23.1
| 13
| 1.7
| 1
| 56
|-
| style="text-align:left;" | Madeira
| colspan="4" bgcolor="#AAAAAA"|
| 2.9
| -
| style="background:; color:white;"|63.6
| 4
| 16.5
| 1
| 4.5
| -
| 5
|-
| style="text-align:left;" | Portalegre
| style="background:#2A52BE; color:white;"|33.4
| 2
| 32.4
| 1
| 26.1
| 1
| colspan="2" rowspan="9" bgcolor="#AAAAAA"|
| colspan="2" rowspan="7" bgcolor="#AAAAAA"|
| 0.7
| -
| 4
|-
| style="text-align:left;" | Porto
| style="background:#2A52BE; color:white;"|46.6
| 19
| 34.3
| 14
| 11.9
| 5
| 1.4
| -
| 38
|-
| style="text-align:left;" | Santarém
| style="background:#2A52BE; color:white;"|42.1
| 6
| 30.4
| 4
| 19.0
| 2
| 1.2
| -
| 12
|-
| style="text-align:left;" | Setúbal
| 24.1
| 4
| 23.5
| 4
| style="background:; color:white;"|44.0
| 9
| 2.8
| -
| 17
|-
| style="text-align:left;" | Viana do Castelo
| style="background:#2A52BE; color:white;"|59.2
| 5
| 22.8
| 1
| 10.0
| -
| 0.7
| -
| 6
|-
| style="text-align:left;" | Vila Real
| style="background:#2A52BE; color:white;"|62.1
| 5
| 22.8
| 1
| 5.1
| -
| 0.8
| -
| 6
|-
| style="text-align:left;" | Viseu
| style="background:#2A52BE; color:white;"|66.8
| 8
| 20.9
| 2
| 5.0
| -
| 0.6
| -
| 10
|-
| style="text-align:left;" | Europe
| style="background:#2A52BE; color:white;"|49.6
| 1
| colspan="2" rowspan="2" bgcolor="#AAAAAA"|
| 15.2
| -
| 25.4
| 1
| 1.4
| -
| 2
|-
| style="text-align:left;" | Outside Europe
| style="background:#2A52BE; color:white;"|85.5
| 2
| 2.6
| -
| 4.0
| -
| 0.4
| -
| 2
|-
|- class="unsortable" style="background:#E9E9E9"
| style="text-align:left;" | Total
| style="background:#2A52BE; color:white;"|44.9
| 126
| 26.7
| 71
| 16.8
| 41
| 2.5
| 8
| 1.1
| 3
| 1.4
| 1
| 250
|-
| colspan=14 style="text-align:left;" | Source: Comissão Nacional de Eleições
|}

Maps

Aftermath

Death of Francisco Sá Carneiro

Just two months after winning the 1980 elections, and while campaigning for the Democratic Alliance's candidate for the December 1980 Presidential election, Prime Minister Francisco Sá Carneiro and his Defense minister Adelino Amaro da Costa, along with their spouses Snu Abecassis and Maria Vaz Pires, respectively, and the plane's pilot, died in tragic air crash when the small aircraft they were on board crashed and burned in Camarate, Loures, shortly after taking off from the main runway of Lisbon Airport. This tragic air crash sparked a series of conspirancy theories, mainly because of Portugal' involvement in the Iran–Iraq War and the supply of weapons to both Iraq and Iran. Several investigations surrounding the crash were conducted and the official cause of the crash is still a matter of intense debate. Diogo Freitas do Amaral was appointed as Interim Prime Minister until the election of Francisco Pinto Balsemão as PSD leader and subsequent nomination as Prime Minister.

Notes

References

External links
 Comissão Nacional de Eleições 
 Centro de Estudos do Pensamento Político

See also

 Politics of Portugal
 List of political parties in Portugal
 Elections in Portugal

Legislative elections in Portugal
Legislative election
Portuguese legislative election